"Breathe" is a song by American singer Blu Cantrell from her second studio album, Bittersweet (2003). A remixed version featuring Sean Paul was released as a single in February 2003, several months after the album version was released in November 2002. The album version of this song was produced and co-written by Ivan Matias and Andrea Martin. The remix featuring Sean Paul was produced by Ivan Matias, Andrea Martin, and Mark Pitts. The song peaked at 70 on the US Billboard Hot 100 and became a hit in Europe, most notably in the United Kingdom, where it topped the UK Singles Chart for four weeks in August 2003.

Background and recording
"Breathe" was originally recorded for the Bittersweet album without Sean Paul, but his vocals were added for the single release. The song uses a slightly altered instrumental of Dr. Dre's 1999 song "What's the Difference" featuring Eminem and Xzibit, which in turn revolved around a sample from Charles Aznavour's 1966 song "Parce Que Tu Crois". In an interview with the Metro, when asked what it was like to work with Dre, Cantrell said, "It was a remix, so I never actually got to meet him. They were his beats, but it was actually produced by another girl, Andrea Martin, and Ivan Matias. If I had to choose, I much prefer the remix to the original."

Music video
The music video was directed by Hype Williams.

Chart performance
"Breathe" did not achieve the same level of success as Cantrell's "Hit 'Em Up Style (Oops!)" in her native US, peaking at number 70 on the Billboard Hot 100 in August 2003, but did stay on the chart for 20 weeks.

The song achieved greater success outside of the United States. In the United Kingdom, "Breathe" debuted and peaked at the top of the UK Singles Chart on August 3, 2003 – for the week ending date August 9, 2003, becoming both Cantrell's and Paul's first chart-topping song in Britain. It spent four weeks at the summit of the chart, replacing Daniel Bedingfield's "Never Gonna Leave Your Side". "Breathe" was eventually dethroned from the top of the chart by the 2003 remix of Elton John's "Are You Ready for Love". It became Britain's eighth-biggest-selling single of 2003, with sales of 330,000, and has since sold over 410,000 copies there.

Track listings

US 7-inch single
A. "Breathe" (rap version featuring Sean Paul) – 3:48
B. "Breathe" (original version) – 3:20

European CD single
 "Breathe" (rap version featuring Sean Paul—radio mix) – 3:49
 "Breathe" (no rap version—radio mix) – 3:21

European maxi-CD single
 "Breathe" (rap version featuring Sean Paul—radio mix) – 3:49
 "Breathe" (no rap version—radio mix) – 3:21
 "Breathe" (Andy & The Lamboy radio edit) – 3:43
 "Breathe" (instrumental) – 3:45

UK CD single
 "Breathe" (rap version featuring Sean Paul)
 "Breathe" (radio mix)
 "Breathe" (Ed Funk & D Rok Remix)

US 12-inch vinyl (2002)
A1. "Breathe" (rap version featuring Sean Paul) – 3:48
A2. "Breathe" (instrumental) – 3:45
A3. "Breathe" (rap version acappella featuring Sean Paul) – 3:48
B1. "Breathe" (rap version featuring E-40) – 3:45
B2. "Breathe" (instrumental) – 3:40
B3. "Breathe" (rap version acappella featuring E-40) – 3:43

Credits and personnel
Credits are taken from the UK CD single liner notes.

Studio
 Recorded and mixed at Sound on Sound Recording Studios (New York City)

Personnel

 Andrea Martin – writing, background vocals, production
 Charles Aznavour – writing
 Richard Bembery – writing
 Melvin Bradford – writing
 Stephon Harris – writing
 Alvin Joiner – writing
 Marshall Mathers – writing
 Ivan Matias – writing, production
 Blu Cantrell – vocals, background vocals
 Sean Paul – featured vocals
 Mark Pitts – production of Sean Paul version, mixing
 Brian "B" Stanley – recording
 Victor Mancusi – recording, mixing

 Rene Antelmann – mixing assistant
 Bojan Dugich – mixing assistant
 C. "Tricky" Stewart – executive production
 Antonio "LA" Reid – executive production
 TAB – A&R director
 Dorsey James – management
 Angie Aguirre – management
 Joe Mama-Nitzberg – creative director
 Courtney Walter – art direction and design
 Adam S. Wahler – art direction and design
 Randy Jones – production coordinator
 Sheryl Nields – photography

Charts

Weekly charts

Year-end charts

Certifications

Release history

See also
 List of Romanian Top 100 number ones of the 2000s

References

2002 singles
Arista Records singles
Bertelsmann Music Group singles
Blu Cantrell songs
European Hot 100 Singles number-one singles
Irish Singles Chart number-one singles
Music videos directed by Hype Williams
Number-one singles in Romania
Sean Paul songs
Songs written by Andrea Martin (musician)
Songs written by Charles Aznavour
Songs written by Eminem
Songs written by Xzibit
UK Singles Chart number-one singles